Grevillea nivea is a species of flowering plant in the family Proteaceae and is endemic to the south of Western Australia. It is a dense shrub with spreading to ascending branches, crowded, divided leaves, the end lobes linear, and dense clusters of red flowers.

Description

Taxonomy
Grevillea nivea was first formally described in 2009 by Peter M. Olde and Neil R. Marriott in the journal Nuytsia from specimens collected near Doubtful Island Bay in 1999. The specific epithet (nivea) means "snow-white", referring to the hairy covering on the branchlets, flowers and floral rachis.

Distribution and habitat
This grevillea grows in low, windswept heath among granite rocks close to the coast near Bremer Bay in the Esperance Plains bioregion of southern Western Australia.<ref name=FB>{{FloraBase|name=Grevillea nivea|id=35503}}</ref>

Conservation statusGrevillea nivea'' is listed as "Priority Two" by the Western Australian Government Department of Biodiversity, Conservation and Attractions, meaning that it is poorly known and from only one or a few locations.

See also
 List of Grevillea species

References

nivea
Proteales of Australia
Eudicots of Western Australia
Plants described in 2009